Buzz is a 1998 Israeli film directed by Eli Cohen, based on a real murder story. It is known for being frequently used and taught in the Israeli education system, as well as the Israel Defense Forces and Israel Prison Service.

Plot
The film is based on a real event in 1994, in which two 14-year-olds—Arbel Aloni and Moshe "Moshiko" Ben-Ivgi—murdered a taxi driver (named Derek Roth). In the film, their names have been changed to Ido Ben Ze'ev and Rafi, respectively. Ido comes from a wealthy family and acts as leader, while Rafi lives with his single mother and follows Ido.

The children start committing crimes such as vandalism and theft, with the knowledge of Ofer Reinitz, a police officer, and the school councilor, Naomi. They work together to put the children in juvenile jail, although Ido's father Gidi, who is a prominent lawyer and personal friend of Ofer's from the army, does not believe the accusations against his son and stops the children from being persecuted on several occasions. After they murder a taxi driver for thrills with an old revolver, both Ido and Rafi are arrested.

Cast
 as Ofer
Tony Tien as Ido
Yitzhak Atzmon as Rafi
Shmil Ben Ari as Gidi (Ido's father)
Ahuva Keren as Naomi
Momo Trelovski as superintendent Rubanenko
Debbi Besserglick as School Principal

Screenings
The film was screened in the Jerusalem Film Festival and in numerous film festivals abroad, including Brussels, Toronto, Palm Beach, Monte Carlo, San Francisco, Boston, Buffalo, St. Louis, Denver and Los Angeles. It was later run frequently on Israel's Channel 2.

External links

1990s Hebrew-language films
1998 films
1998 drama films
Films directed by Eli Cohen
Israeli crime drama films